Aleksandra Mir (born 1967) is a Swedish-American contemporary artist known for her collaborative installations and projects. Her work deals with travel, time, placehood, language, gender, identity, locality, nationality, globality, mobility, connectivity, performativity, representation, transition, translation and transgression. She is known for her large scale collaborative projects and for her anthropological methods, involving rigorous archival research, oral history and field work.

She has exhibited at Kunsthaus Zurich (2006), Tate Modern, London (2014), Tate Liverpool (2017), Modern Art Oxford (2017), Schirn Kunsthalle, Frankfurt (2009), M – Museum Leuven (2013), Whitney Museum of American Art (2014), Solomon R. Guggenheim Museum (2007), MoMA, New York City (2012), YUZ Museum, Shanghai (2018), Whitney Biennial (2004), Biennale of Sydney (2002), Biennale di Venezia (2009), and Mercosul Biennial, Porto Alegre (2015), Tai Kwun Contemporary, Hong Kong (2020).

Personal life
Mir was born in Lubin, Poland in 1967. Her Polish citizenship was revoked during the 1968 Polish political crisis. She holds dual Swedish-American citizenship. She grew up in Sweden, where she studied at the University of Gothenburg. She moved to the United States in 1989 to attend the School of Visual Arts in New York and studied cultural anthropology at the Graduate Faculty of the New School for Social Research. Mir lived in Palermo, Sicily from 2005 to 2010. She lives in London.

Work
The How Not to Cookbook, (Collective Gallery, Edinburgh, 2009 and Rizzoli, NYC 2010) collected advice from 1,000 home cooks from around the world who explained what not to do in the kitchen.

In First Woman on the Moon (1999), Mir converted a Dutch beach into a moonscape for one day with the help of bulldozers. The video of this event has been presented at multiple venues, at the International Space University, Strasbourg   and at the UK Space Conference, Liverpool, 2015.

In 2002, Mir painted the Mandela Way T-34 Tank pink with Cubitt Artists.

For Newsroom 1986–2000 (2007), Mir with a group of assistants copied 240 NYC tabloid covers in felt-tip marker and mounted them in an ever-revolving installation to simulate the daily workings of a Manhattan newsroom. Mir has created a series of large scale murals using only Sharpie marker pens.

In Triumph she collected 2529 trophies from the general public of Sicily and exhibited them all in one installation at the Schirn Kunsthalle, Frankfurt (2009). It traveled to the South London Gallery for the London Olympics in 2012.

Mir has created Plane Landing, a real size helium inflatable jet plane, meant not to fly, but to hover above the ground as "a sculpture of a jet plane in a permanent state of landing". The work further challenges the notion of time and space; with regard to the planes permanent state of landing - is its location a hangar or a permanent museum.

References

External links
 Sculpture Unlimited, Institute for the Fine Arts and Cultural Studies, Linz, Austria
 Tara Expeditions, Antarctica
 Aleksandra Mir at Drawing Room, London
 Aleksandra Mir at Whitney Museum of American Art, New York
 Aleksandra Mir at Solomon R. Guggenheim Museum, New York
 Aleksandra Mir at South London Gallery

1967 births
Living people
20th-century American women artists
21st-century American women artists
20th-century Swedish women artists
20th-century Swedish artists
21st-century Swedish women artists
21st-century Swedish artists
American contemporary artists
Swedish contemporary artists
The New School alumni
Swedish people of Polish descent
Polish women artists
Bâloise Prize winners